The Atlas-Agena was an American expendable launch system derived from the SM-65 Atlas missile. It was a member of the Atlas family of rockets, and was launched 109 times between 1960 and 1978. It was used to launch the first five Mariner uncrewed probes to the planets Venus and Mars, and the Ranger and Lunar Orbiter uncrewed probes to the Moon. The upper stage was also used as an uncrewed orbital target vehicle for the Gemini crewed spacecraft to practice rendezvous and docking. However, the launch vehicle family was originally developed for the Air Force and most of its launches were classified DoD payloads.

The Atlas-Agena was a two-and-a-half-stage rocket, with a stage-and-a-half Atlas missile as the first stage, and an RM-81 Agena second stage. Initially, Atlas D missiles, redesignated as the LV-3, were used as the first stage. These were later replaced by the standardized Atlas SLV-3, and its derivatives, the SLV-3A and B. The final Atlas-Agena launch used an Atlas E/F.

The earliest Agena variant was the Agena A in 1959–60, which did not have restart capability. Most of these were flown on Thor-Agena boosters for the Discoverer program and only four used Atlases (Midas 1, Midas 2, Samos 1, and Samos 2), two of which failed.

Late in 1960, Lockheed introduced the uprated Agena B stage which was restartable and had longer propellant tanks for more burn time. It first flew on the Thor and did not make its maiden voyage on an Atlas for months, when Midas 3 launched on July 12, 1961. Atlas-Agenas were then used for DoD and NASA programs, but proved a reliability nightmare as one failure after another happened. In late 1962, after Ranger 5 suffered another booster malfunction, albeit a minor one that ground controllers were able to work around, NASA convened a review board which undertook a wholesale reevaluation of the Atlas-Agena as a launch vehicle. The board found that quality control and checkout procedures were poor, and that this situation was exacerbated by the several dozen configurations of the booster, as each individual DoD and NASA program necessitated custom modifications to the Atlas and Agena, and the latter also differed in its Atlas and Thor variants. The board recommended improved quality control, better hardware, and also establishing one standardized launch vehicle for all space programs.

The end result was the Atlas SLV-3 and Agena D, standardized versions of the Atlas D core and Agena B which would be the same on every launch (at least as far as the Atlas was concerned, Agena Ds often still had customized setups, especially for DoD payloads). The Agena D first flew in July 1963 for DoD launches, but NASA continued using Agena Bs for the remaining Ranger missions. The Atlas SLV-3 meanwhile first flew in August 1964. Dozens of Atlas SLV-3/Agena D boosters were flown over the following years, mostly for the KH-7 Gambit program, also for a few NASA missions. The last Atlas-Agena was flown in 1978 to launch SEASAT, but on a repurposed Atlas F missile rather than the SLV-3.

Launches were conducted from Launch Complexes 12, 13 and 14 at the Cape Canaveral Air Force Station, and Launch Complexes 1 and 2 at Point Arguello (now SLC-3 and 4 at Vandenberg Air Force Base).

Variants

Destruct system
Some Atlas-Agena variants contained an Inadvertent Separation Destruct System (ISDS) to destroy the Agena in the event that it separated prematurely from the Atlas, a situation that could be caused by a booster hard-over or if the Atlas self-destructed in flight. The ISDS charges were mounted on the adapter section between the two vehicles and would activate if a series of tripwires were broken. During the coasting period between staging, the ISDS charges were disabled. The Atlas's own RSO charges were also wired so that they would destroy both vehicles if activated. Most Agenas also had their own separate RSO charges, although NASA planetary probes omitted them for weight-saving reasons and due to the flight trajectory used, which meant that destruct of the Agena was no longer possible following staging.

The Gemini-Agena Target Vehicle had a specially modified Range Safety destruct system designed to fire slugs into the propellant tanks rather than the conventional method of rupturing them externally, since an inadvertent activation of the RSO system in orbit could endanger the Gemini astronauts.

The very first Atlas-Agena flight, Midas 1 in February 1960, failed when the unproven ISDS system mistakenly activated at staging, rupturing the Atlas's LOX tank and causing the breakup of the Agena. The ISDS system was redesigned afterwards and this failure mode did not repeat itself.

Production launches

Ranger

The Ranger spacecraft were designed to impact the Moon, returning photographs of the lunar surface until their destruction. The spacecraft was designed in three Blocks, all similar in appearance with a forward antenna and magnetometer, supported by a boom, with more sensors and two solar panels and a dish antenna mounted at the base. The first two Block I spacecraft, Ranger 1 and Ranger 2, were launched on August 23 and November 18, 1961, not to the Moon, but in intended high Earth orbits to test the Atlas-Agena and spacecraft capabilities. However, the Agena malfunctioned on both flights and left the probes trapped in a useless low Earth orbit from which they soon decayed.

The Block II missions, Ranger 3, Ranger 4, and Ranger 5, were launched away from Earth in January, April, and October 1962, but all three failed due to either malfunctions of the probe or launch vehicle difficulties. Ranger 3 missed the Moon entirely. Ranger 4's solar panels failed to deploy, and the navigation system failed, sending the probe to impact the lunar far side without returning any pictures or data.

Ranger 6, launched January 30, 1964, successfully impacted the Moon but its cameras failed to return pictures. The last three Rangers were finally successful: Ranger 7 in July 1964, Ranger 8 in February 1965, and Ranger 9 in March 1965.

Mariner

The Mariner spacecraft were built by NASA's Jet Propulsion Laboratory. Mariner 1 and Mariner 2 were twins, launched on July 22 and August 27, 1962, to fly by the planet Venus. The first two craft used the same spacecraft bus as the Block I Rangers, each weighing  and instrumented to perform radiometric temperature measurements of the planet, and to measure interplanetary magnetic fields and particles.
Mariner 1's Atlas-Agena malfunctioned and went off course, requiring its destruction approximately 5 minutes after liftoff. Mariner 2 successfully made the 3½-month flight, becoming the first spacecraft to fly by another planet. It carried microwave and infrared radiometers, and sensors for cosmic dust, solar plasma and high-energy radiation, and magnetic fields.

Mariner 3 and Mariner 4 used a redesigned spacecraft bus weighing , and were launched on November 5 and November 28, 1964, to fly by the planet Mars. Mariner 3 failed after a successful launch when its payload shroud failed to open. These Mariners carried cameras, and Mariner 4 successfully returned pictures of Mars as it flew by.

The  Mariner 5 was successfully launched to Venus on June 14, 1967, and flew by in October,  probing Venus's atmosphere with radio waves, scanning its brightness in ultraviolet light, and sampling solar particles and magnetic field fluctuations above the planet.

Gemini

The Agena rocket stage was used as the passive docking target for the Gemini crewed space program. After docking, the Agena could also be fired by the astronauts to raise the combined Gemini-Agena spacecraft into a higher orbit. The first attempt at such a docking mission was made for the Gemini 6 mission on October 25, 1965, but the Agena suffered an engine failure and did not reach orbit. This forced postponement and replanning of the Gemini 6A mission, which performed rendezvous with Gemini 7 without docking.

The GATV was first successfully launched for Gemini 8 on March 16, 1966, permitting the first successful docking in space. GATV-8 was later used as the secondary Agena target for Gemini 10, which also docked with its own GATV. GATV-9 failed to orbit when the Atlas suffered a control malfunction, forcing a similar reschedule of the Gemini 9A mission using a backup Augmented Target Docking Adapter atop an Atlas, but with no Agena rocket stage. Two more GATVs were successfully launched and used on Gemini 11 and Gemini 12.

Lunar Orbiter

A series of five Lunar Orbiter spacecraft were launched from August 1966 through August 1967, to help select landing sites for the Apollo lunar landing program by mapping the Moon's surface. All launches were successful, and a total of 99 percent of the surface of the Moon (near and far side) was mapped with resolution as high as 3 ft 3 in (1 meter). Altogether the Orbiters returned 2180 high resolution and 882 medium resolution frames. The spacecraft also carried micrometeroid sensors, which showed the average micro-meteoroid flux near the Moon to be two orders of magnitude greater than in interplanetary space, but slightly less than the near-Earth environment.

OAO
Orbiting Astronomical Observatory was a series of NASA satellites flown between 1966 and 1972 for astronomy studies. The first OAO (launched April 8, 1966) used a one-off Atlas variant, mating an Agena D to the LV-3C variant of the Atlas and encased in a Centaur-type payload shroud. The remaining three launches used actual Atlas-Centaur vehicles.

ATS
Applications Technology Satellite was a series of NASA satellites flown in 1967–69 to perform various technology tests. Only the first ATS was launched on an Atlas-Agena, the remainder using Atlas-Centaurs. ATS-1 was a partial failure when the Agena failed to restart, leaving it in LEO.

OGO
Orbiting Geophysical Observatory was a series of NASA satellites flown between 1964 and 1969 for magnetosphere studies. These satellites used several different booster types, including Thor-Agenas. Five of them used Atlas-Agenas, and OGO 5 (launched March 4, 1968) was the sole civilian use of the Atlas SLV-3A Agena.

Midas
Missile Defense Alarm System was a series of Air Force satellites flown between 1960 and 1966 for infrared detection of ballistic missile exhaust plumes on Atlas-Agena A, B, and D. There were several failures and overall program performance was poor, but it would give way to the more successful DSP satellites.

Samos
Samos was a series of Air Force satellites flown between 1960 and 1962 for photoreconnaissance on Atlas-Agena A and B. There were several failures, including an on-pad explosion of an Atlas, and the program was cancelled at the end of 1962 without ever demonstrating any operational capability.

Gambit
KH-7 Gambit was a series of Air Force satellites flown between 1963 and 1966 for photoreconnaissance on Atlas-Agena D. Although there were a number of mission failures, Gambit overall was highly successful in comparison with the bungled Samos program and it returned high-value area reconnaissance of the USSR and China before giving way to KH-8 Gambit in 1967.

Rhyolite/Canyon
Rhyolite/Canyon was a series of Air Force satellites flown between 1968 and 1978 for SIGNIT intelligence on Atlas SLV-3A Agena. One Canyon mission failed when its Atlas went off course and had to be destroyed. These were the final launches of Atlas-Agena vehicles aside from the one-off Atlas F/Agena used to launch Seasat.

Vela
Vela consisted of two sets of Air Force satellites flown in 1964–65 to monitor Soviet compliance with the Nuclear Test Ban Treaty on Atlas-Agena Ds.

Snapshot
Snapshot was a one-off Air Force test of a nuclear satellite flown in 1965 on an Atlas-Agena D.

References

Rockets and missiles
Atlas (rocket family)